John Waller Head (November 2, 1822 – November 9, 1874) was an American lawyer, legislator, and Tennessee Attorney General.

Background
Head was born in Castalian Springs, Tennessee. He was educated in Sumner County, Tennessee. Head studied law and was admitted to the Tennessee bar. He lived in Gallatin, Tennessee and practiced law. Head served in the Tennessee Senate from 1855 to 1857, and was a reporter for the Tennessee Supreme Court from 1858 to 1862. He then served as Tennessee Attorney General from 1858 to 1861. During the American Civil War, Head served in the Confederate Army, as a colonel, in the 30th Tennessee Regiment. 

In 1874, Head was elected to the United States House of Representatives from the 4th Tennessee Congressional District. But he died from pneumonia at his home in Gallatin, Tennessee only six days after the election, long before the Congress convened again.

See also
List of members-elect of the United States House of Representatives who never took their seats

Notes

External links

|-

1822 births
1874 deaths
19th-century American lawyers
19th-century American politicians
Deaths from pneumonia in Tennessee
Elected officials who died without taking their seats
People from Castalian Springs, Tennessee
People from Gallatin, Tennessee
People of Tennessee in the American Civil War
Tennessee Attorneys General
Tennessee lawyers
Tennessee state senators